Valrhona is a French premium chocolate manufacturer based in the small town of Tain-l'Hermitage in Hermitage, a wine-growing district near Lyon. It is now a subsidiary of Savencia Fromage & Dairy. The company was founded in 1922 by a French pastry chef, Albéric Guironnet, from the Rhône valley and has five subsidiaries and 60 local distributors across the globe. It is one of the leading producers of gastronomic chocolate in the world. The company also maintains the École du Grand Chocolat, a school for professional chefs with a focus on chocolate-based dishes and pastries. In 2015 Valrhona opened the École Valrhona Brooklyn, a pastry school in Brooklyn; there are also two Écoles Valrhona in France and one in Japan.

Valrhona focuses mainly on high-grade luxury chocolate marketed for commercial use by chefs as well as for private consumption. The product line includes chocolate confectionery, plain and flavored chocolate bars and bulk chocolate in bars or pellets. Valrhona produces vintage chocolate made from beans of a single year's harvest from a specific plantation, primarily the Grand Crus which is grown in South America, Oceania and the Caribbean. The company has been B Corp–certified since January 2020.

See also 
 List of bean-to-bar chocolate manufacturers

References

External links 
 

French chocolate companies
Food and drink companies established in 1922
French brands
French companies established in 1922
Certified B Corporations in the Food & Beverage Industry